Chaloem Phra Kiat District, Saraburi is a district (amphoe) in the northern part of Saraburi province, central Thailand.

History
Tambons Huai Bong, Ban Keng, Khao Din Phatthana, Phu Khae, and Na Phra Lan were separated from Mueang Saraburi district to create the new district on 5 December 1996, as one of five districts named Chaloem Phra Kiat commemorating the 50th anniversary of the ascension to the throne of King Bhumibol Adulyadej (Rama IX). This area was selected because there is a royal project in the district at Wat Mongkhon Chaiphatthana managed by the Chaiphatthana Foundation.

Geography
Neighboring districts are (from the north clockwise) Phattana Nikhom of Lopburi province, Kaeng Khoi, Mueang Saraburi, Sao Hai and Phra Phutthabat of Saraburi Province.

Administration
The district is divided into six sub-districts (tambons), which are further subdivided into 51 villages (mubans). Na Phra Lan has township (thesaban tambon) status and covers parts of the same-named tambon. Each of the six tambons is administered by a tambon administrative organization (TAO).

Environment
Tambon Na Phra Lan may be the sub-district with the worst air quality in Thailand. The Saraburi Provincial Industry Office counts 133 cement or aggregate plants, 17 mining sites, 32 stone milling plants, and 22 stone dressing plants in the vicinity. PM10 particles in the air are roughly three times higher than the mandated 120 micrograms per cubic meter permitted by air quality standards. Levels of PM2.5 ranged from 45-79 μg/m3. Thailand's PM2.5 maximum recommendation is 50 μg/m3 and that of the World Health Organization (WHO) is 25 μg/m3.

In 2018, 165 days of the year exceeded particulate matter limits in Na Phra Lan, a 27% increase over 2017. Particulates measured between 27-303 μg/m3. Sources were industrial plants, rock mines, dense traffic, and "ruined roads".

References

External links
amphoe.com

Chaloem Phra Kiat, Saraburi Province